The Chronicles of Evil is a 2015 South Korean thriller film written and directed by Beak Woon-hak (or Baek Woon-hak), starring Son Hyun-joo, Ma Dong-seok, Choi Daniel and Park Seo-joon.

Plot
Highly decorated homicide detective Choi Chang-sik has an enviable record and the respect of his peers. Days before a promotion, he dozes off on his way home after a celebratory drink with his colleagues. He wakes up to find that his taxi driver has taken him to a remote mountain trail and has pulled a knife on him. The two struggle, and Choi manages to kill the taxi driver in self-defense. Afraid that the incident would negatively impact his career, he covers up the crime scene and flees. The next day, the taxi driver's dead body has been strung up on a crane in front of the police station, and Choi is assigned to the case amidst widespread media attention. Choi's ordeal begins as he tries to misdirect the investigation and remove evidence, to the growing suspicion of rookie detective Cha Dong-jae. Then a man claiming to be the killer turns himself in and threatens to reveal the truth unless Choi reopens an old case.

Cast
 Son Hyun-joo as Choi Chang-sik
 Ma Dong-seok as Detective Oh
 Choi Daniel as Kim Jin-gyu
 Park Seo-joon as Cha Dong-jae
 Jung Won-joong as Chief of police
 Woo Jung Kook as Kim Bong-soo
 Lee Jun-hyeok as Lee Myeong-cheon
 Lee Seung-ho as Supporting
 Jung Joon-won as Myeong-ho
 Bae Jin-woong as Gambler in the past
 Ji Dae-han as Apartment man
 Eom Ji-seong as Cha Dong-jae
 Han Geu-rim as Traffic situation room female employee
 Yoon Hee-won as Deputy head of department Kang
 Jang Joon-nyeong as Autopsy

Release
The Chronicles of Evil was released in South Korean theaters on May 14, 2015. It opened at first place in the box office with 857,000 admissions in its first four days, grossing .

Awards and nominations

References

External links 
  
 The Chronicles of Evil at CJ Entertainment
 
 
 

2015 films
2010s Korean-language films
South Korean crime thriller films
2015 crime thriller films
Films directed by Beak Woon-hak
CJ Entertainment films
South Korean films based on actual events
2010s South Korean films